Juan Enrique Alberto Etchegaray Aubry (born 5 May 1945) is a Chilean politician who served as minister of State under Patricio Aylwin's government.

References

External links
 Profile at Annales de la República

1945 births
Chilean people of Basque descent
Chilean people of French descent
Pontifical Catholic University of Chile alumni
20th-century Chilean politicians
Chilean civil engineers
Government ministers of Chile
Living people